The Battle of Mabitac was an engagement in the Philippine–American War, when on September 17, 1900, Filipinos under General Juan Cailles defeated an American force commanded by Colonel Benjamin F. Cheatham, Jr.

Mabitac was linked to the garrison town of Siniloan by a causeway which, on the day of the battle, was flooded with water (in many parts waist-deep). The water in the flanking rice fields was even deeper, making it impossible to properly deploy off the narrow road. Trenches occupied by Filipinos under Cailles cut across this causeway, blocking the path into Mabitac.

The battle began when elements of the 37th Infantry Regiment and 15th Infantry Regiment, advancing from Siniloan, came under intense fire some 400 yards from the enemy trenches, estimated at 800 in strength. Eight troops sent ahead to scout the enemy positions died to the last man as they closed to within 50 yards of the Filipinos. One of the last to fall was 2nd Lieutenant George Cooper. General Cailles, in an honorable gesture, let the defeated Cheatham recover the bodies of the eight slain soldiers after the battle.

Meanwhile, the main body of U.S. Infantry had become pinned down in the waist-deep mud, still several hundred yards from the Filipino trenches. Unable to properly deploy, and in a dangerously exposed position, they engaged in a firefight with Philippine forces for nearly 90 minutes. Despite the bravery of one Captain John E. Moran, later awarded the Medal of Honor for trying to rally his demoralized comrades, the Americans were badly mauled, sustaining scores of casualties.

Even supporting fire from a U.S. Navy gunboat (some 1,300 yards distant) and an attempted flank attack by 60 Americans, who had not participated in the costly frontal assault, could not dent the Filipino position, and Cheatham withdrew soon after. Eventually, General Cailles managed a skillful withdrawal in order to avoid envelopment, and by the next day, his entire command had made good their escape.

According to the Americans the US Army lost some 21 killed and 23 wounded in the battle, an effective loss of 33% of their strength (termed a "profoundly impressive loss" by American General Arthur MacArthur, Jr. in an effort to allay the potential shock on U.S. servicemen). American estimates put Filipino losses at 11 killed and 20 wounded. Numbered among their dead was Lieutenant Colonel Fidel Sario.

A differing version of the battle exists in the Philippine Revolutionary Records. A letter addressed to a Miguel Estrada by one Faustin Pantua says this:

American Major-General John C. Bates later said of this battle: "It is deemed charitable as well as politic to drop a veil over this matter rather than to give any publicity that can be avoided."

After this First Battle of Mabitac in 1900, a second battle was fought here during the Second World War in 1945. The town was liberated from the Japanese Imperial Army by the Philippine Commonwealth troops of the 4th, 41st, 42nd and 43rd Infantry Division of the Philippine Army and the 4th Constabulary Regiment of the Philippine Constabulary with some guerrilla elements.

References 

Conflicts in 1900
1900 in the Philippines
Battles of the Philippine–American War
Battle of Mabitac
Battles involving the United States
Mabitac River
September 1900 events